Zuccarini is a surname. Notable people with the surname include:

 John Zuccarini (born 1947), American businessman convicted of violating the Truth in Domain Names Act
 Joseph Gerhard Zuccarini (1797–1848), German botanist
 Oliviero Zuccarini (1883–1971), Italian journalist, politician, and activist